Kimbiji is an administrative ward in the Temeke district of the Dar es Salaam Region of Tanzania. Kimbiji is named after Medieval Swahili settlement in the ward. According to the 2002 census, the ward has a total population of 3,673.

See also
 Historic Swahili Settlements

References

Swahili people
Swahili city-states
Swahili culture
Temeke District
Wards of Dar es Salaam Region